Latika Thukral (born ) is an Indian banker who transformed her city, in particularAravali Biodiversity Park in Gurgaon. where a million native trees were planted by the group #IAmGurgaon. She was awarded the Nari Shakti Award in 2015 by the President of India.

Life
Thukral was born in about 1967 and she graduated in marketing at the University of Delhi. She worked for two years with ITC Hotels before beginning an 18-year career at Citibank where she rose to be a senior vice president.

She came to notice when she became concerned at the city of Gurgaon. She had moved there in 1996 and the small town had grown, but it had grown without design or planning. She lived in a middle class area but one park in continue caught her notice. She founded the campaign #IamGurgaon in 1999 and she attracted other volunteers. They decided to plant a million native trees in their city.

The Haryana Government, on Republic Day in 2010 gave her an appreciation award. 'IamGurgaon' has been working with the local government and their projects had attracted support from corporate companies.

She was awarded one of the first eight Nari Shakti Awards for her leadership and achievement in 2015. The award was made on International Women's Day from the then Indian President Pranab Mukherjee.

During the coronavirus outbreak in 2020, #IamGurgaon was highly involved with the task of supplying cooked food to the impoverished families of the city. Some areas were being helped by nearby condominiums. Thukra estimated in April that they would need to supply food for at least two months. It was estimated that it was going to cost 3,250 rupees per family, per month, and there were estimated to be fifteen to twenty thousands of families.

References 

1967 births
20th-century Indian businesswomen
20th-century Indian businesspeople
21st-century Indian businesswomen
21st-century Indian businesspeople
Businesswomen from Haryana
Delhi University alumni
Indian women environmentalists
Indian women bankers
Living people
People from Gurgaon